Math and Other Problems is the first album released by Atlanta-based rock band Marvelous 3. The album was released in 1997 through the Deep South label.

Track listing
All songs written by Butch Walker.
 "Appetite" - 2:57
 "Make Up" - 3:00
 "Last Sleep" - 3:07
 "Leopard Print" - 3:08
 "Retail Girl" - 3:27
 "Pizza and Wine" - 3:35
 "Cars Collide" - 3:59
 "Valium" - 3:54
 "Bottle Rockets" - 2:26
 "I Wanna Go to the Sun" - 3:09
 "In the Beginning of Relationships" - 1:40
 "Katrina" - 3:16

References

1997 debut albums
Marvelous 3 albums